Farhad Fakhreddini (born 11 March 1938 in Tabriz, East Azerbaijan) is a renowned Iranian composer, conductor and founder of Iran’s National Orchestra.

He led Iran's Radio and Television Orchestra from 1973 to 1979.

Fakhreddini has composed music for some of Fereydoon Moshiri's poetry.

Fakhreddini was awarded the 1st Class Order of Culture and Art by the Iranian government in June 2005.

In July 2008, a stamp was issued in his honour.

In July 2009, Fakhreddini quit his position with the Iran's National Orchestra.

One of the best film music writers, such as Sarbedaran & Ememali film & Kif e Englisi

See also
Music of Iran
List of Iranian musicians

References 

1937 births
Living people
People from Tabriz
Iranian composers
Iranian conductors (music)
Recipients of the Order of Culture and Art
21st-century conductors (music)
Iranian Science and Culture Hall of Fame recipients in Music